Gregory John Terlecky (born March 20, 1952) is a former Major League Baseball pitcher. He was traded along with Buddy Bradford from the Cardinals to the White Sox for Lee Richard on December 12, 1975.

References

External links

1952 births
Living people
Baseball players from California
St. Louis Cardinals players
Major League Baseball pitchers
Arkansas Travelers players
Columbus Clippers players
Iowa Oaks players
Springfield Redbirds players
Tulsa Oilers (1964–1984) players
American expatriate baseball players in Mexico
Tigres del México players
University of Oregon alumni
Whittier College alumni
The American College of Financial Services alumni